NSC–Mycron is a Malaysian UCI Continental road cycling team founded in 2015.

References

Cycling teams based in Malaysia